Regla Hernández (born 27 April 1968) is a Cuban former basketball player who competed in the 1992 Summer Olympics.

References

1968 births
Living people
Cuban women's basketball players
Olympic basketball players of Cuba
Basketball players at the 1992 Summer Olympics